Maigret and the Mad Woman (French title: La Folle de Maigret is a 1970 detective novel by the Belgian writer Georges Simenon featuring his character Jules Maigret. Maigret regrets his folly in dismissing an old lady whom he had taken to be mad because of her claims she was about to be murdered, only for her to be killed shortly afterwards.

Adaptations
In 1992 it was made into an episode of an ITV Maigret series.

References

1970 Belgian novels
Maigret novels
Presses de la Cité books